Vicars Island is a small ice-covered island about  off the coast of Enderby Land. It was discovered on 12 January 1930 by the British Australian New Zealand Antarctic Research Expedition (BANZARE) under Mawson. He named it after an Australian textile company which presented the expedition with cloth for uniforms.

See also 
 List of antarctic and sub-antarctic islands

Islands of Enderby Land